KOFI (1180 AM) is a radio station licensed to serve Kalispell, Montana.  The station is owned by KOFI, Inc.  It airs an Oldies music and News/Talk radio format.  The station first signed on in 1955. It was assigned these call letters by the Federal Communications Commission.

Their studios are downtown Kalispell at 317 1st Ave. E. with sister station KZMN. The transmitter site is in Evergreen, on Steel Bridge Road. KOFI must power down to 10,000 watts at night to protect Class A clear-channel WHAM in Rochester, New York.  Nonetheless, its signal has been received over most of the western United States at night, as far south as Salt Lake City and as far west as Snohomish, Washington.

George Ostrom was a mainstay at the station from 1956 to 2008; he recently came out of retirement to work at KGEZ.

Since 2017, KOFI's AM broadcasts are simulcast on 104.3 FM, as noted on the station's website.

References

External links
KOFI official website

OFI
News and talk radio stations in the United States
Oldies radio stations in the United States